Jwaar Bhata is a 1973 Indian Hindi film. Produced by Hargobind and N. Bhansali, the film stars Dharmendra, Saira Banu, Jeevan, Rajindernath and Sujit Kumar. The film's music is by Laxmikant Pyarelal. The film was a remake of Telugu film Dagudu Moothalu.

Plot
Widowed and wealthy Durgadas Prasad (Nazir Hussain) is the sole owner of Shriman Mills. He has one son, who falls in love with a woman from a poor family. This disappoints Durgadas and he asks his son to leave. His son leaves, gets married, and soon has a son. Unfortunately, Durgadas's son does not live for long, leaving his wife and son Biloo who is looked after by a restaurant owner who also passes away leaving his three siblings in the care of Biloo. Gayatri who runs away from home due to a forced marriage to an old man by her step Mom, who takes shelter at Biloo's house. Durgadas has a change of heart and goes around looking for his son and his family, but in vain. Years later Durgadas is much more older and not expected to live long. He recruits a secretary, Gayatri, (Saira Banu) who looks after him. Then when his relatives insist that he adopt his distant nephew, Anokhey (Rajendranath), he agrees, only to have Gayatri bring home a young man, Billoo, (Dharmendra) who operates a simple Dal Roti restaurant. Durgadas is jubilant when he verifies that Billoo is indeed his grandson and throws a grand party. After the party, Durgadas passes away, leaving everything in Billoo's hands. Billoo changes his name to Balraj and starts to look after his grandfather's business. Durgadas's relatives, Iqbal Nath, his daughter, Rekha; (Meena T) a cousin, Satwani (Shammi), and her son, Anokhey; along with Advocate Ramesh Khanna, (Sujit Kumar) conspire with each other and concoct a plan — a plan so devious that will not only entrap Billoo and Gayatri in it — but also make them loathe the day they met Durgadas.

Cast
 Dharmendra  as Balraj Prasad "Billoo" 
 Saira Banu as Gayatri  
 Sujit Kumar  as  Advocate Ramesh Khanna
 Jeevan as Iqbal 
 Nazir Hussain as Durgadas Prasad
 Sunder as Pandit Shiv Shankar  
Rajendra Nath as Anokhelal 
 Shammi as Satwanti  
 Jayshree T. as Courtesan Phool Kumari  
 Meena T. as Rekha Nath (Iqbal's daughter)
 Baby Guddi    
 Baby Pinky    
 Sabina as (as Baby Sabira)  
 Randhir as Gayatri's Father  
 Sulochana Chateejee as Gayatri s step mom
 Shivraj as Dr. Shivraj

Soundtrack
All songs are written by Rajinder Krishan.

References

External links
 

1973 films
Hindi remakes of Telugu films
1970s Hindi-language films
Films scored by Laxmikant–Pyarelal
Films directed by Adurthi Subba Rao